Irving Alger Hall, Jr. (November 23, 1913 – January 24, 1964) was an American football fullback who played for the Philadelphia Eagles of the National Football League (NFL) for one season in 1942.  He played college football for Brown and he was drafted by the Eagles in the sixteenth round of the 1939 NFL Draft. He served in World War II for the United States Marine Corps.

References

1913 births
1964 deaths
American football fullbacks
Brown Bears football players
Philadelphia Eagles players
Players of American football from Massachusetts
People from Raynham, Massachusetts
United States Marine Corps personnel of World War II